Greg Edmonson is an American music composer for television and movies. He is primarily known for composing the soundtrack to the cult TV series Firefly. He is also the composer for the first three games in the Uncharted video game series, and for a number of episodes of the American animated sitcom King of the Hill.

Biography
Greg Edmonson grew up in Dallas, Texas and played the guitar as a youth. He studied jazz composition at the University of North Texas College of Music. Later, while he was a studio musician and session player, he went to the Musicians Institute of Technology. He has studied with Dr. Albert Harris, the former musical director for NBC and a leading composition teacher and music lecturer.

As a protégé of the widely successful and well known TV composer Mike Post (Magnum, P.I., Hill Street Blues, The Rockford Files), Edmonson worked on a number of series providing additional scoring for Post (credited and sometimes not credited).

His compositions are usually written on the piano but he sometimes uses a guitar.

Discography

Film
Turn of the Blade (1994)
Science Fiction: A Journey Into the Unknown (1994)
Last Lives (1997)
Martian Law (1998)
Frog and Wombat (1998)
Undercover Angel (1999)
Blue Ridge Fall (1999)
Gary the Rat (2000)
Luckytown (2000)
Fast Women (2001)
Miss Castaway and the Island Girls (2004)
Sweet Union (2004)
My First Christmas Tree (2007)
Skyrunners (2009)
Montana Amazon (2011)
Bounty Killer (2013)

Television
Cop Rock (1990)
Masters of the Maze (1994–1995)
King of the Hill (1997–2009)
Firefly (2002–2003)
F.L.I.P. Mysteries: Women on the Case (2008)

Video games
Uncharted: Drake's Fortune (2007)
Uncharted 2: Among Thieves (2009)
Uncharted 3: Drake's Deception (2011)

Awards

References

External links
Tracksounds Interview with Greg Edmonson

Year of birth missing (living people)
Living people
American film score composers
American male film score composers
American television composers
University of North Texas College of Music alumni
Musicians Institute alumni
Varèse Sarabande Records artists
Firefly (TV series)
King of the Hill